Martez Ivey (born July 25, 1995) is a professional gridiron football offensive tackle for the Edmonton Elks of the Canadian Football League (CFL). He played college football at Florida.

High school career
Ivey attended Apopka High School in Apopka, Florida. In his sophomore year, Ivey helped protect quarterback Zack Darlington as Apopka went on a 13–2 record, and won the 2012 FHSAA Class 8A state title over Cypress Bay. The following year, Apopka reached the state 8A final again, but lost to South Dade. After Darlington graduated, the offensive load was carried by halfback Chandler Cox. With Ivey paving the way, Apopka went 12–4 and beat Miami Columbus for the 2014 Class 8A state title. Ivey was recognized with the Hall Trophy as the U. S. Army Player of the Year.

Regarded as a five-star recruit by Rivals.com, Ivey was ranked as the No. 1 offensive tackle prospect in his class. With offers from virtually every major football program, Ivey said he was “50/50” between Florida and Auburn after his final visit. On National Signing Day 2015, he announced his commitment to the University of Florida.

College career
In August 2015, Ivey suffered a slightly torn meniscus in his left knee during practice, and was scheduled for arthroscopic surgery on August 28. He was sidelined for a little more than two weeks, before making his college debut against Kentucky on September 19. Ivey played in the final twelve games of the season, starting in the last eight including the Citrus Bowl against Michigan. After the season, Ivey was named to the SEC All-Freshman team by the conference's coaches.

Professional career

New England Patriots
On July 30, 2019, Ivey signed with the New England Patriots as an undrafted free agent. He was released during final roster cuts on August 30, 2019.

Tampa Bay Vipers
Ivey was drafted in the 2nd round in phase two in the 2020 XFL Draft by the Tampa Bay Vipers. He had his contract terminated when the league suspended operations on April 10, 2020.

Carolina Panthers
Ivey signed with the Carolina Panthers on April 6, 2021. He was waived on August 28, 2021.

Toronto Argonauts
On October 15, 2021, Ivey signed with the Toronto Argonauts.

Edmonton Elks
The Edmonton Elks traded for Ivey just before the 2022 CFL season, acquiring him and Jalen Collins from the Toronto Argonauts for a 2023 6th Round Draft Pick.

References

External links
 
 Toronto Argonauts bio
 Florida Gators bio

1995 births
Living people
American football offensive tackles
Carolina Panthers players
Florida Gators football players
New England Patriots players
Tampa Bay Vipers players
People from Apopka, Florida
Players of American football from Florida
Sportspeople from Orange County, Florida
Toronto Argonauts players